Masuya (written: 桝屋 or 増矢) is a Japanese surname. Notable people with the surname include:

, Japanese politician
, Japanese footballer

See also
Masaya (given name)

Japanese-language surnames